Akinwunmi Isola (24 December 1939 – 17 February 2018) was a Nigerian playwright, novelist, actor, dramatist, culture activist and scholar. He was known for his writing in, and his work in promoting, the Yoruba language. As an actor, he was known for Agogo Eèwò (2002), Efunsetan Aniwura (1981) and Efunsetan Aniwura (2005).

Early life and career
Isola was born in Ibadan in 1939, attended Labode Methodist School and Wesley College. He studied at the University of Ibadan, earning a B.A. in French.

He was appointed professor at the same University in 1991. Isola wrote his first play, Efunsetan Aniwura, during 1961-62 while still a student at the University of Ibadan. This was followed by a novel, O Le Ku. In 1986, he wrote and composed the college anthem that is currently being sung in Wesley College Ibadan.

He went on to write a number of plays and novels. He broke into broadcasting, creating a production company that has turned a number of his plays into television dramas and films. Though he claimed that "my target audience are Yorubas", Isola also wrote in English and translated to Yoruba. The award-winning writer spent his lifetime producing works that promoted the Yoruba language.

On May 4, 2015, his book Herbert Macaulay and the Spirit of Lagos was staged at University of Ilorin, Kwara state at the Performing Arts Theatre. It was directed by Adams Abdulfatai Ayomide, for the annual season of plays festival.

In 2000, in recognition of his immense contributions, he was awarded the National Merit Award and the Fellow of the Nigerian Academy of Letters. He was a visiting professor at the University of Georgia. Nigerian playwright, dramatist and actor, Professor Akinwumi Ishola died aged 78.

Personal life
Isola was married and had four children. He died on 17 February 2018 in Ibadan, Oyo State, aged 78.

References

Links
Interview from The Sun newspaper
Profile

University of Ibadan alumni
Yoruba writers
1939 births
2018 deaths
Writers from Ibadan
Male actors from Ibadan
Nigerian dramatists and playwrights
Yoruba dramatists and playwrights
Yoruba male actors
Nigerian male film actors
University of Lagos alumni
Male actors in Yoruba cinema
Yoruba-language writers
English-language writers from Nigeria
English–Yoruba translators
Yoruba academics
Academic staff of Obafemi Awolowo University
University of Georgia faculty
20th-century Nigerian writers
20th-century Nigerian dramatists and playwrights
Nigerian expatriate academics in the United States
20th-century translators